Elizabethville or Elisabethville may refer to:
 Elizabethville, Ontario, Canada
 Elizabethville, Pennsylvania, USA
 Lubumbashi, formerly Elisabethville, Democratic Republic of the Congo

See also Elisabethville, the Belgian community in Birtley, County Durham.